Stephen Adams (October 17, 1807May 11, 1857) was a slave owner and United States Representative (1845 to 1847) and Senator (1852 to 1857) from Mississippi.

Early years
Adams was born to David Adams, a Baptist clergyman, in Pendleton, South Carolina, he moved with his parents to Franklin County, Tennessee in 1812. He attended the public schools, studied law, was admitted to the bar in 1829, practiced in Franklin County.

He was a slave owner.

Career
He was a member of the Tennessee Senate, from 1833 to 1834, when he removed to Aberdeen, Mississippi and commenced the practice of law. He was circuit court judge from 1837 to 1846, and was elected as a Democratic representative to the Twenty-ninth Congress, serving from March 4, 1845 to March 3, 1847. He again became a judge of the circuit court in 1848, was a member of the Mississippi House of Representatives in 1850 and was a delegate to the State constitutional convention in 1851.

Adams was elected to the U.S. Senate on February 19, 1852, to fill the vacancy caused by the resignation of Jefferson Davis and served from March 17, 1852 to March 3, 1857; while in the Senate he was chairman of the Committee on Retrenchment (Thirty-third and Thirty-fourth Congresses).

Last years
At the close of his term he removed to Memphis, Tennessee and resumed the practice of law until he died there of smallpox on May 11, 1857 and was interred in Elmwood Cemetery.

References

Sources
  

1807 births
1857 deaths
Mississippi state court judges
Democratic Party members of the Mississippi House of Representatives
People from Aberdeen, Mississippi
Politicians from Memphis, Tennessee
People from Pendleton, South Carolina
Tennessee state senators
Democratic Party United States senators from Mississippi
19th-century American politicians
19th-century American judges
Democratic Party members of the United States House of Representatives from Mississippi